The 71st running of the Tour of Flanders cycling race was held on 5 April 1987. It was won by Claude Criquielion after a 10 km solo breakaway. 88 of 233 starters finished the race.

Race report
Danish rider Jesper Skibby was in the early breakaway, before going solo. On the slippery cobbles of the Koppenberg, he fell onto the road banking and was subsequently run over by an official's car. After the Koppenberg, a group of ten riders, containing most favourites, broke clear. Claude Criquielion broke away from the elite group just after the Bosberg, the last climb of the day,  and powered on to the finish. Sean Kelly won the sprint for second place before Eric Vanderaerden. Criquielion was the first French-speaking Belgian rider to win the Tour of Flanders and the only one until Philippe Gilbert won the 2017 Tour of Flanders.

Route
The race started in Sint-Niklaas and finished in Meerbeke (Ninove) – totaling 275 km.
The course featured 13 categorized climbs:

Results

External links
Video of the 1987 Tour of Flanders on Sporza (in Dutch)

References

Tour of Flanders
Tour of Flanders
Tour of Flanders
1987 Super Prestige Pernod International